The Little River Raisin is a  tributary of the River Raisin in southeastern Michigan in the United States.

See also
List of rivers of Michigan

References

Michigan  Streamflow Data from the USGS

Rivers of Michigan
Tributaries of Lake Erie